Nestlé Candy Shop (formerly The Willy Wonka Candy Company) was a brand of confectionery owned and licensed by the Swiss corporation Nestlé. The brand was discontinued in 2018 when the branding and production rights of the products were sold to the Ferrero Group.

History

Origins 
The previous Wonka brand's inception comes from materials licensed from the British author Roald Dahl. His classic 1964 children's novel, Charlie and the Chocolate Factory, and its film adaptations are the sources of both the packaging and the marketing styles of the Wonka brand. Dahl had licensed the "Wonka" name to film director Mel Stuart. The film's producer David L. Wolper convinced the Quaker Oats Company to advance $3 million to finance the film in exchange for the right to use the Wonka name to sell candy bars. Quaker, who had no previous experience in the film industry, bought the rights to the book and financed the picture to promote their new "Wonka Bar". The title of the film was changed to Willy Wonka & the Chocolate Factory for promotional purposes. 

The brand was launched on 17 May 1971, one month before the release of the novel's first film adaptation on 30 June 1971. In 1975, Breaker Confections was acquired by Sunmark Corporation of Saint Louis, Missouri. In 1980, the Breaker Confections brand name was changed to Willy Wonka Brands in an attempt to develop the Wonka brand image before it was sold out in 1986 to Rowntree Mackintosh Confectionery of the UK, who, then sold it out in 1988 to Swiss company Nestlé, who in 1993 renamed it Willy Wonka Candy Company, and then in 2015 Nestlé Candy Shop. In 1988, the Willy Wonka Candy Company brand, then owned by Sunmark Corporation, was acquired by Nestlé. The original Wonka Bars never saw store shelves due to factory production problems before the film's release; however, subsequent Wonka product releases were highly successful, including the Everlasting Gobstopper in 1976 and Nerds in 1983. 

From 1988 to 2017, Nestlé sold sweets and chocolate under the Wonka brand name in the United States, Canada, the United Kingdom, Ireland, Australia, New Zealand, Japan, South Africa, Mexico, Colombia, Brazil, Argentina, Costa Rica, Panama, Dominican Republic, and the Middle East. The cessation of the Wonka brand was due to the impending sale of branding rights to the Ferrero Group.

Products (at time of discontinuation) 

 Bottle Caps
 Everlasting Gobstopper
 Fun Dip
 Laffy Taffy
 Nerds
 Pixy Stix
 Runts
 Spree
 SweeTarts
 SweeTarts Chewy Sours
 SweeTarts Soft & Chewy Ropes
 Wonka Ice Cream (Peel-A-Pops and Push Ups)
 Mixups
 Randoms (Rowntree's Randoms in the UK, made and sold in the US under the Wonka brand)

Previous products 

 Chewy Runts
 DinaSour Eggs
 Dweebs
 Everlasting Hot Gobstoppers
 Sour Gobstoppers
 Longlasting Gobstoppers
 Fizzy Jerkz
 FruiTart Chews
 Fruit Marvels
 Gummy Nerds
 Oompas
 Punky's
 Rinky Dinks
 Scrumdidilyumptious
 Shock Tarts Sour Gum Balls
 Super Skrunch
 Tangy Bloops
 Tangy Bumps
 Tangy Bunnys
 Tart 'n' Tinys
 Tinglerz
 Volcano Rocks
 Wacky Wafers
 Willy Wonka's Guppies
 Willy Wonka's Squids
 Willy Wonka's Watermelon
 Wonka Bar
 Wonka Biscuits
 Wonka Daredevils
 Wonka Donutz
 Xploder

References

External links 

 

Food and drink companies established in 1971
Candy
British chocolate companies
Willy Wonka